Nebo is a genus of scorpions in the family Diplocentridae.

Species
 Nebo flavipes Simon, 1882 
 Nebo franckei Vachon, 1980 
 Nebo grandis Francke, 1980 
 Nebo henjamicus Francke, 1980 
 Nebo hierichonticus (Simon, 1872) 
 Nebo omanensis Francke, 1980 
 Nebo poggesii Sissom, 1994 
 Nebo whitei Vachon, 1980 
 Nebo yemenensis Francke, 1980

References

Scorpion genera
Diplocentridae